Wye Bridge is a section of the Severn Bridge, the first road bridge built over the Severn Estuary which now carries the M48 motorway.

Wye Bridge  may also refer:

Bridges across the River Wye
Old Wye Bridge, Chepstow
Wye Bridge, Hereford, a Grade I listed bridge in Herefordshire
Wye Bridge, Monmouth

Bridges elsewhere
a bridge in Wye, Kent

See also 
List of crossings of the River Wye